This is a list of peer-reviewed scientific journals published in the field of probability.

Advances in Applied Probability
ALEA - Latin American Journal of Probability and Mathematical Statistics
Annales de l’Institut Henri Poincaré
Annals of Applied Probability
Annals of Probability
Bernoulli
Brazilian Journal of Probability and Statistics
Combinatorics, Probability and Computing
Communications on Stochastic Analysis
Electronic Communications in Probability
Electronic Journal of Probability
ESAIM: Probability and Statistics
Finance and Stochastics
Journal of Applied Probability
Journal of Theoretical Probability
Markov Processes and Related Fields
Methodology and Computing in Applied Probability
Modern Stochastics: Theory and Applications
Probability and Mathematical Statistics
Probability in the Engineering and Informational Sciences
Probability Surveys
Probability Theory and Related Fields
Queueing Systems
Random Matrices: Theory and Applications
Random Operators and Stochastic Equations
Random Structures & Algorithms
Stochastics: An International Journal of Probability and Stochastic Processes
Statistics & Probability Letters
Stochastic Analysis and Applications
 Stochastics and Dynamics 
Stochastic Models
Stochastic Processes and their Applications 
Stochastic Systems
Theory of Probability and Its Applications
Theory of Probability and Mathematical Statistics
Theory of Stochastic Processes

See also 
 List of scientific journals
 List of statistics journals
 List of mathematics journals

 
 
Journals
Probability